J. Willard Thompson (March 30, 1935 – November 3, 2018) was an American Thoroughbred racehorse trainer. A former steeplechase jockey, he won three straight training titles at Monmouth Park Racetrack between 1975 and 1977 and again won in 2001. He also earned back-to-back titles at the Meadowlands Racetrack in 1980 and 1981.

Willard Thompson is the co-holder of two major training records at Monmouth Park. He is tied with John Tammaro III for most races won during a race meeting with fifty-five, and tied with John H. Forbes for most wins on a single racecard with four. 

In 1996, Thompson was the first recipient of Monmouth Park Racetrack's Virgil W. Raines Distinguished Achievement Award for his dedication to the sport of Thoroughbred racing through exemplary conduct demonstrating professionalism and integrity. 

Thompson died in 2018 at the age of 83.

References

 March 15, 1990 Lexington Herald-Leader article on J. Willard Thompson
 Raines award winners

1935 births
2018 deaths
American horse trainers
Sportspeople from Atlanta